The Willoughby of Chevy Chase is a large high-rise condominium building in Montgomery County, Maryland, on the outskirts of Washington, D.C. It was originally designed by award-winning, modernist architect Vlastimil Koubek and opened in 1969 as the Willoughby Apartments. The Willoughby Apartments was built for luxury rentals, and when it opened, it was the largest residential building in the DC area.

The Willoughby project was built in 1965 by Washington developer Milton A. Barlow, however the firm ran out of funds and the completion of the building was taken over by the loan financier, Riggs National Bank. The Willoughby Apartments changed ownership several times and, ultimately, was sold to First Condominium Development Company of Chicago, specialists in condominium conversions. Apartment sales and control of the condominium turned over to unit owners in 1982. 

There are 815 units including efficiencies, one-, two- and three-bedroom apartments, commercial office space, a convenience store, 701 parking garage spaces, and a restaurant. The building was built with many luxury amenities: an exercise room, 24-hour staffed desk, laundry rooms, library, party room, rooftop lounge, and pool. Bylaws prohibit pets and were recently amended to restrict smoking.

Location 
The Willoughby is part of the high-density Village of Friendship Heights census-designated neighborhood in the town of Chevy Chase, Maryland. It is adjacent to Willoughby Park and on the edge of a high-end commercial district.

References 

Chevy Chase, Maryland
Friendship Village, Maryland
Residential skyscrapers in Maryland
Skyscrapers in Maryland
Buildings and structures in Montgomery County, Maryland
Residential buildings completed in 1969